"Let Me Go, Rock 'n' Roll" is a song by the American hard rock band Kiss, released in 1974. It was released as the only single from their second album Hotter Than Hell. Even though the song failed to chart, it is a staple in their live concerts. The B-side was the album title track, "Hotter Than Hell". Gene Simmons penned the lyrics during a lunch break at his day job, and the song conveys romantic excitement: "'Cause baby's got the feeling/Baby wants a show/Baby won't you tell me/Baby rock & roll, yeah, yeah!". "Let Me Go, Rock 'n' Roll" became a live favorite for Kiss.

Background
The song is one of the few Kiss compositions in which lyrics were written before the music. It was based on a riff Paul Stanley had been working on. It was demoed for inclusion on the debut album, but was left off. Despite not being included on the album, it was performed during the Kiss Tour in support of the album.

Kiss have played this song live since their early days and it ended their encores until the American leg of the Destroyer Tour, when it was replaced by "Black Diamond" and later "Rock and Roll All Nite". It has remained a concert staple and has appeared on many of the band's compilations.

The original song title was "Baby, Let Me Go" but was soon changed by producer Kenny Kerner to "Rock 'n' Roll" before finally being titled "Let Me Go, Rock 'n' Roll". When performed live, the song has often been extended to nearly five minutes due to guitar and bass solos.

Record World called it "heavy metal heaven."

Live performances
It was regularly played until the 1977 Love Gun Tour, where it was excluded, but came back for the Alive II and Dynasty tours. Except for a club performance on September 8, 1993, the song was not played live from 1980 to 1995. It was returned to the setlist for the Reunion Tour. It was left out on the Rock the Nation Tour, but returned on the Alive 35 Tour and has been played ever since.

Appearances
"Let Me Go, Rock 'n' Roll" has appeared on following albums:
Hotter Than Hell – studio version
Alive! – live version
The Originals – studio version
Double Platinum – studio version
The Box Set – demo version
Kiss Symphony: Alive IV – live version
Gold – studio version
Kiss Chronicles: 3 Classic Albums – studio version
Kiss Alive! 1975–2000 – Alive! version
Kiss Alive 35 – live version

Track listing
A-side – "Let Me Go Rock 'n' Roll"
B-side – "Hotter Than Hell"

Personnel
Gene Simmons – lead vocals, bass
Paul Stanley – rhythm guitar, backing vocals
Peter Criss – drums
Ace Frehley – lead guitar

References

Songs about rock music
Kiss (band) songs
1974 singles
Songs written by Paul Stanley
Songs written by Gene Simmons
Casablanca Records singles
1974 songs
American rock-and-roll songs